Ornativalva angulatella is a moth of the family Gelechiidae. It was described by Pierre Chrétien in 1915. It is found in Algeria and Tunisia.

The wingspan is about 14 mm. Adults have been recorded on wing from March to June and in October.

References

Moths described in 1915
Ornativalva